Johnny Kleinveldt (6 August 1957 – 30 May 2019) was a South African cricketer. He played in fifteen first-class matches for Western Province and Transvaal from 1979/80 to 1982/83. His sons Matthew and Gary have played cricket, and his nephew, Rory, has played Test matches for South Africa.

References

External links
 

1957 births
2019 deaths
South African cricketers
Gauteng cricketers
Western Province cricketers
Cricketers from Cape Town
White South African people